Amt Britz-Chorin-Oderberg is an Amt ("collective municipality") in the district of Barnim, in Brandenburg, Germany. Its seat is in the town Britz. It was formed on 1 January 2009 by the merger of the former Ämter Britz-Chorin and Oderberg.

The Amt Britz-Chorin-Oderberg consists of the following municipalities:
Britz
Chorin
Hohenfinow
Liepe
Lunow-Stolzenhagen
Niederfinow
Oderberg
Parsteinsee

Demography

References

Britz-Chorin
Barnim